Neke is a town located in Isi-Uzo Local Government Area of Enugu State in South Eastern Nigeria. Bordered by towns such as Nike (Nike Lake Resort), Ikem (Local Government Area Capital), Mbu, Eha Amufu, Obollo and UmuAlor, Neke is a small town with a strong backbone. In the pre-colonial era, the people of Neke were known as fearsome warriors who had an economic stronghold on neighboring areas. In the present day, there are 5 main districts located in Neke namely; Ishienu, Akpani, Obegu Aba, Umugwu and Umuegwu. These districts represent villages made up of clans and kindred prominent to the town's social structure.

Geographically, Neke is located between two major cities, Enugu and Nsukka. Hence, serving as an access point to traders and commuters travelling along the Enugu-Nsukka Axis.
(Agricultural Projects Monitoring, Evaluation and Planning Unit, 1980)
Politics

As part of Isi-Uzo Local Government Area, Neke is within the Enugu East Senatorial Zone although prior to 1996 Isi-Uzo prominently belonged to the Nsukka geopolitical area. In 1976, Chief Sam Nwaroh, a prominent son of Neke was appointed as the first local government chairman of Isi-Uzo. The late Chief Nwaroh later served as a member of the House of Representatives and the first Igwe of Neke.

Language & Culture

The people of Neke speak a very distinct Igbo dialect caught between Enugu and Nsukka language dialects. The town people typically practice both traditional and Christian religion although Christianity has subjugated most of its traditional or ancestral practices. The two main denominations of Christianity in Neke are; The Anglican Church at St. Stephens and Catholic Church at St. Patrick's Parish.

The people of Neke celebrate some very important annual festivals such as Onwa-Asaa, Aju, Igwokoji, Ote Mgbereke, Igede and Okanga. These festivals are part of what makes the town unique in its own way. Essentially, each event represents a seasonal change as well as cultural and social bond that bring people together.

The popular traditional titles enjoyed by the people include the Oha and the Igwe. The Oha is headed by the eldest man in the community while Igwe is the royal father of the community.

Economy

A majority of the local population of Neke are farmers for the town is blessed with fertile lands. The major food crops produced include Yam, Palm Oil and Cassava. These crops after harvest are sold at the two main markets; Nkwo and Ore Markets. The Nkwo market is the most popular due to its location at the town center.

Education

St.Patrick's Mission Community Primary School

Community Secondary School, Neke{
  "type": "FeatureCollection",
  "features": [
    {
      "type": "Feature",
      "properties": {},
      "geometry": {
        "type": "Point",
        "coordinates": [
          8.613281250000002,
          7.013667927566642
        ]
      }
    }
  ]
}Isi-Uzo Technical College, Ikem-Neke

Postal Codes for 5 main Districts

Akpani 412105; Isienu 412105; Obegu-Aba 412105; Umuegwu 412105; Umugwu 412105

References

Populated places in Enugu State